Anaheim Cemetery is a public cemetery established by German immigrants in c. 1866 in Anaheim, Orange County, California. Since 2002, it has had a historical marker issued by the county.

History 
Anaheim Cemetery was founded in 1866, or 1867. Founding trustees of this cemetery included Theodore Schmidt, an immigrant from Bielefeld, Germany; and John Peter Zeyn, a merchant from San Francisco. The Pioneer Gate was erected in 1915, and donated by Fredrick A. Hartmann.

The earliest graves were of the German immigrant population, and some of the early German tombstones are intricately carved. Many of the early leaders of Anaheim and Orange County are interred at this cemetery.

See also 
 List of cemeteries in California

References 

Cemeteries in Orange County, California
Buildings and structures in Anaheim, California
1866 establishments in California
Cemeteries established in the 1860s